The Coleopterist is a UK-based journal for specialists in coleopterology (the study of beetles). First published in March 1992, it is the successor to The Coleopterist's Newsletter, which was published from 1980 to 1991.

External links
 
 The Coleopterist back issues
 The Coleopterist's Newsletter downloads

Entomology journals and magazines
Beetle literature
Publications established in 1992